Daniel Meredith House is a historic home located in West Whiteland Township, Chester County, Pennsylvania. It was built about 1815, and is a two-story, three bay, double pile side hall stone dwelling in the 2/3 Georgian style.  Also on the property is a contributing 19th century spring house and ruins of a barn.

It was listed on the National Register of Historic Places in 1984.

References

Houses on the National Register of Historic Places in Pennsylvania
Georgian architecture in Pennsylvania
Houses completed in 1815
Houses in Chester County, Pennsylvania
National Register of Historic Places in Chester County, Pennsylvania